Jan Krzysztof Damel, also known as Jonas Damelis and Johann Damehl in other languages (1780 – 30 August 1840) was a Polish neoclassicist artist in the age of Partitions, associated with the School of Art at Vilnius University (modern-day Lithuania).

Life

Born in Mitau, Duchy of Courland and Semigallia (now Jelgava, Latvia, 1918 name change), Damel (Damelis) studied art at Vilna University under Jan Rustem and Franciszek Smuglewicz, receiving a degree in 1809. He lived in Vilnius (Wilno) until he was deported to Siberia in 1820. Upon his release he lived in St. Petersburg and Minsk. He is considered one of the most prominent historical artists of the neoclassicist genre working in present-day Belarus.

His works include paintings of historic events (the Kościuszko Uprising, Napoleon's army in Vilnius, the death of Ulrich von Jungingen during the Battle of Grunwald, and the Battle of Vienna), portraits, drawings, and religious compositions. Among his successful students was Michał Kulesza.

Notes

References
  VILNIAUS KLASICIZMO DAILININKAI. (VILNIUS CLASSICISM) Lietuvos dailės muziejus, 2000 (Association of Lithuanian Museums). Retrieved 2016-12-24 via archived copy.

1780 births
1840 deaths
People from Jelgava
People from the Duchy of Courland and Semigallia
Neoclassical painters
Lithuanian painters
Belarusian painters
Latvian painters
Polish painters
Polish male painters
Vilnius University alumni